Talladega Superspeedway, nicknamed "Dega", and formerly named Alabama International Motor Speedway (AIMS) from 1969 to 1989, is a motorsports complex located north of Talladega, Alabama. It is located on the former Anniston Air Force Base in the small city of Lincoln. A tri-oval, the track was constructed in 1969 by the International Speedway Corporation, a business controlled by the France Family. , the track hosts the NASCAR Cup Series, NASCAR Xfinity Series, NASCAR Craftsman Truck Series, and ARCA Menards Series. The total peak capacity of Talladega is around 175,000 spectators, with the main grandstand capacity being about 80,000.

History
 
During the 1960s, William "Bill" France, Sr. wanted to build a track faster and longer than his Daytona International Speedway. After failed attempts to negotiate with local government in Orange County, North Carolina, with the Occoneechee Speedway, he attempted to find a new spot for a race track and make his idea a reality. After failing to secure a location near the research triangle around Raleigh, France then looked around between Atlanta and Charlotte around Greenville, South Carolina to build the track as it would take away business from the tracks there. However, Sunday blue laws prevented races from being held on Sundays in South Carolina. (The Southern 500 was held on Labor Day itself back in the day), after failing to agree to terms with officials, France set his sights elsewhere. He then looked between Atlanta and Birmingham along Interstate 20. The track opened on September 13, 1969, costing $4 million. The track was named the "Alabama International Motor Speedway". The name would remain for twenty years until 1989, when the facility's name was changed to "Talladega Superspeedway".

In the first race at the track, all the original drivers aside from Bobby Isaac, Richard Brickhouse, Jim Vandiver abandoned the track due to tire problems, which forced France to hire substitute drivers, the winner being Brickhouse. After the first race, Talladega hosted two Cup Series races a year, one of which would become part of the 10-race NASCAR Cup Series playoff format.

Since its opening year, Talladega has hosted many races and has been repaved four times. Talladega has also had many first-time winners, such as Richard Brickhouse, Ron Bouchard, Bobby Hillin Jr, Davey Allison, Brian Vickers, Brad Keselowski, Ricky Stenhouse Jr. and Bubba Wallace .

A  infield road course operated from the track's founding until 1983. In the 1970s, six IMSA GT Championship races were held at the speedway, including a 6-hour race in 1978. The International Motorsports Hall of Fame museum was opened in 1983. It is scheduled to host the National Finals for the United States version of the UK-based Greenpower Electric Car Challenge at Talladega Superspeedway, for student-built electric cars, in May 2022.

In May 2006, Talladega started to re-surface the track and the apron. Construction started on May 1 and lasted until September 18. The first race on the resurfaced race track was a NASCAR Craftsman Truck Series race on October 7.

In December 2013, the ISC announced removal of the 18,000-seat Allison Grandstand on the backstretch, reducing the track's seating capacity to 80,000. The 4,000-ft backstraightaway was renamed the "Alabama Gang Superstretch" in time for the 2014 Aaron's 499 held in the spring.

"The Big One"

Talladega has the record for the fastest recorded time by a NASCAR vehicle on a closed oval course, with the record of  set by Rusty Wallace on June 9, 2004. Wallace circled the  trioval in 44.270 seconds, which surpassed the previous record held by Bill Elliott set in 1987, but did not replace the record because it was a radio test and not a NASCAR sanctioned event. Bill France himself invited Chrysler to run a 200 lap for publicity for the April race. The car was fully NASCAR inspected and certified. NASCAR sanctioned the event and Bill Gazaway was there with the official timing equipment. Baker's 200 mph lap was set while driving the No. 88 Chrysler Engineering Charger Daytona. It is currently undergoing restoration in Detroit, after being found in the late 1990s in Iowa.

In May 1987, Bobby Allison, after contacting debris from a blown engine, cut his right-rear tire while going through the tri-oval section of the track. The car was vaulted airborne. His car damaged a section of the frontstretch catch fence but did not enter the spectator area. NASCAR imposed rule changes to slow the cars after the incident, with a 1988 rule requiring cars running there and at Daytona to again use restrictor plates. The most often cited reason is a fear that the increasing speeds exceeded the tires' capabilities at the time, as high-speed tire failure had led to some terrific crashes at slightly lower speeds. The plates limit the amount of air and fuel entering the intake manifolds of the engine, significantly reducing the power of the cars and hence their speed. Like restrictor plates, NASCAR changed the package for Daytona and Talladega to use tapered spacers, which are larger throttle bodies than the plates, and restrict less airflow, allowing larger horsepower, increased closing rates, and slightly higher speeds. This has led to a highly competitive racing style at Talladega and Daytona. Allison's crash was very similar to Carl Edwards's airborne crash at the 2009 Aaron's 499.

The reduced power affects not only the maximum speed reached by the cars but also the time it takes them to achieve their full speed, which can be nearly one full circuit of the track. The racing currently seen at Talladega is exceptionally tight, often in rows of three or four cars, and sometimes even five lanes wide on the straightaways throughout most of the field, as the track is wide enough to permit such racing. Breaking away from the pack is very difficult as well.

However, such close quarters make it extremely difficult for a driver to avoid an incident as it unfolds in front of them. The slightest mistake can lead to a multi-car accident dubbed "the Big One" by fans and drivers. It is uncommon but possible to see 20 or more cars collected in the crashes. Occasionally, cars go airborne and barrel-roll or slide on their roofs. However, NASCAR has made several advances in safety over the years to lessen the chance of a car going airborne.

The Talladega Curse
Numerous strange occurrences at the track have led to rumors of Talladega being cursed. Stories of the origin of the curse vary. Some claim that a local Native American tribe held horse races in the valley where the track currently resides, where a chief was killed when he was thrown from his horse. Others say that the site of the superspeedway was once an Indian burial ground. Still another version says that after the local tribe was driven out by the Creek nation for their collaboration with the forces of Andrew Jackson, a shaman put a curse on the valley.

Since the construction of the track, many unusual events and untimely deaths have fueled the rumors of a jinx or curse. In the 1973 Talladega 500, NASCAR Rookie of the Year Larry Smith died of massive head injuries in a solo crash, one that was reported by commentators as a heavy hit, but believed by no means bad enough to be fatal. Later in the same race, driver Bobby Isaac parked his car and announced he was quitting racing; he did not participate in another race for the remainder of the 1973 season. Isaac explained, "Something told me to quit. I don't know anything else to do but abide by it." At the time of Isaac's death in 1977, friend and colleague Ned Jarrett told reporters that the reason Isaac parked his car in Talladega was because he "had heard a voice that told him to quit".

During the 1974 Winston 500, Penske Racing crewman Don Miller lost part of his leg in a pit lane accident. Miller was helping service his team's AMC Matador, driven by Gary Bettenhausen. Another driver hit the car in the pit lane, pinning Miller between the pit wall and Bettenhausen's car. In the Talladega 500 a few months later, ten of the top eleven qualifying drivers found that their cars had been mechanically—and elaborately—sabotaged the night before the race. While most of the damage was quietly repaired before the race, the culprit was never found.

In the 1975 Winston 500, Randy Owens, brother-in-law of Richard Petty and a crew member on the family team Petty Enterprises (father of current NASCAR Cup Series crew chief Trent Owens), was killed by an air tank that exploded in the pits.

To some, Bobby Allison's wreck in 1987 described above was yet another reminder of the curse. In 1993, his son, Davey Allison, died in a helicopter crash in the infield of Talladega.

In 1996, Automobile Racing Club of America president Bob Loga died after a traffic accident in a parking lot. ARCA team owner James Hylton was killed in a highway accident following the 2018 ARCA race, 22 years and one day after former ARCA president Bob Loga died.

The Legend of Hallowdega, a comedic short film about the Talladega jinx, was directed by Terry Gilliam and released in 2010. In a similar vein, YouTuber EmpLemon released an hour-long analysis of the Talladega Curse in October of 2021.

Scheduled races
Talladega hosts many NASCAR events, including two Cup Series races, one Xfinity Series race, and one Truck Series race. The Truck Series race is 250 miles (94 laps). Once a 500 kilometer affair, the ARCA race was shortened to 300 miles in 1998 and to 250 miles in 2006 when it was moved to Friday.

NASCAR Cup Series records
(As of 3/24/19)

*minimum fifteen starts

Current races
 NASCAR Cup Series
GEICO 500
YellaWood 500
 NASCAR Xfinity Series
Unhinged 300
Ag-Pro 300
 NASCAR Camping World Truck Series
Chevrolet Silverado 250
 ARCA Menards Series
General Tire 200

In the winter, the circuit's infield also hosts the Birmingham Ultimate Disc Association Mud Bowl tournament.

Lap Records
The outright fastest track record set during a race weekend on the  Tri-Oval is 44.998 seconds, set by Bill Elliott in a Ford Thunderbird, during qualifying for the 1987 Winston 500. The fastest official lap records at Talladega Superspeedway (formerly Alabama International Motor Speedway) are listed as:

Records
This was also a world record at the time for any vehicle on a closed course. It was achieved using official NASCAR scoring and timing equipment.
It stood as a world record for four years, and as a United States record until 1986.
May 6, 1984: The Winston 500 set a motorsports record with 75 lead changes in a single race.
Elliott won the race despite losing nearly two laps during a lengthy early pit stop to fix a broken oil line, and despite the race only having two caution flags. Elliott made up the entire distance he lost under one lengthy, green-flag period. Mark Martin later broke the record for fastest 500-mile NASCAR race (see below).
The car was compliant with NASCAR rules.

April 30, 1987: Bill Elliott set the all-time NASCAR qualifying record, winning the pole for the Winston 500 at a speed of (44.998 seconds). The record still stands due to the use of the carburetor restrictor plates, mandated from 1988 to 2019.
1996: Saab set endurance and speed record-breaking runs in their 900 Talladega.
October 15, 2000: Dale Earnhardt set a record for the most wins at the track with 10. This was also his 76th and final win before his death in the 2001 Daytona 500.
April 6, 2003: Dale Earnhardt Jr. won his fourth consecutive Cup race at Talladega. The race also saw NASCAR's largest NASCAR Cup Series wreck to date, when 27 cars piled up in turn one on lap four.
Wallace topped out at 228 mph in testing and said that speeds of about 235 mph were attainable. 
April 25, 2010: The Aaron's 499 broke the 1984 mark of 75 lead changes with 88; it also set a new motorsports record with 29 different leaders.
October 7, 2012: A crash involving 25 cars erupted on the final lap when Tony Stewart and Matt Kenseth were battling for the win; Stewart made contact with Michael Waltrip and went up the track in turn four; he flipped over as the field plowed into a suddenly blocked track. Jeff Gordon and Kyle Busch escaped the crash as Kenseth went on to win. The race lead changed a season-high 54 times.

First-time winners
Many drivers won the first race of their careers at Talladega. As of October 4, 2021, twelve Cup drivers and two Xfinity drivers have won their first race at Talladega.

Richard Brickhouse*
Dick Brooks*
Lennie Pond*
Ron Bouchard*
Bobby Hillin Jr.*
Davey Allison
Phil Parsons*
Ken Schrader
Brian Vickers
Brad Keselowski
Ricky Stenhouse Jr.
Bubba Wallace
* As of April 2022, this was their only career win in the series.

Film and television
 1983: Stroker Ace
 2005: The Amazing Race: Family Edition
 2006: Talladega Nights: The Ballad of Ricky Bobby
 2007: Postcards from Buster This Just In!

Notes

References

Further reading
 Bolton, Mike and Jim Nunn (October 7, 2006) "Talladega doesn't measure up." Birmingham News. – Updates previously published track dimensions with new measurements taken during 2006 repaving.
 Fielden, Greg. NASCAR Chronicle. Lincolnwood, IL: Publications International, Ltd., 2004.

External links

Talladega Superspeedway Official Site

Talladega Superspeedway page  on NASCAR.com
GNEXTINC.com: Talladega Superspeedway Page – Local area information, track specs, mapping, news and more.
Jayski's Talladega Superspeedway Page – Current and Past Talladega Superspeedway News

NASCAR tracks
Motorsport venues in Alabama
ARCA Menards Series tracks
International Race of Champions tracks
Buildings and structures in Talladega County, Alabama
IMSA GT Championship circuits
Tourist attractions in Talladega County, Alabama
Reportedly haunted locations in Alabama
Sports venues completed in 1969
1969 establishments in Alabama